Tytthoscincus keciktuek, the Sungai Peres forest skink, is a species of skink. It is endemic to Malaysia.

References

keciktuek
Endemic fauna of Malaysia
Reptiles of Malaysia
Reptiles described in 2018
Taxa named by Larry Lee Grismer